Minimum Wage-Fixing Machinery Convention, 1928 is  an International Labour Organization Convention.

It was established in 1928:
Having decided upon the adoption of certain proposals with regard to minimum wage-fixing machinery,...

The principles of the convention were modified and included in the Minimum Wage Fixing Machinery (Agriculture) Convention, 1951 and Minimum Wage Fixing Convention, 1970.

Ratifications
As of 2015, 105 states have ratified the convention. One state, the United Kingdom, has ratified it but subsequently denounced it.

External links 
Text.
Ratifications.

International Labour Organization conventions
Minimum wage law
Treaties concluded in 1928
Treaties entered into force in 1930
Treaties of Albania
Treaties of the People's Republic of Angola
Treaties of Argentina
Treaties of Armenia
Treaties of Austria
Treaties of Australia
Treaties of the Bahamas
Treaties of Barbados
Treaties of Belarus
Treaties of Belgium
Treaties of Belize
Treaties of the Republic of Dahomey
Treaties of Bolivia
Treaties of the Second Brazilian Republic
Treaties of the Kingdom of Bulgaria
Treaties of Burkina Faso
Treaties of Burundi
Treaties of Cameroon
Treaties of Canada
Treaties of the Central African Republic
Treaties of Chad
Treaties of Chile
Treaties of the Republic of China (1912–1949)
Treaties of Colombia
Treaties of the Comoros
Treaties of the Republic of the Congo
Treaties of Costa Rica
Treaties of Cuba
Treaties of Czechoslovakia
Treaties of the Czech Republic
Treaties of Ivory Coast
Treaties of the Republic of the Congo (Léopoldville)
Treaties of Djibouti
Treaties of Dominica
Treaties of the Dominican Republic
Treaties of Ecuador
Treaties of the United Arab Republic
Treaties of Fiji
Treaties of the French Third Republic
Treaties of Gabon
Treaties of the Weimar Republic
Treaties of Ghana
Treaties of Grenada
Treaties of Guatemala
Treaties of Guinea
Treaties of Guinea-Bissau
Treaties of Guyana
Treaties of the Kingdom of Hungary (1920–1946)
Treaties of India
Treaties of the Iraqi Republic (1958–1968)
Treaties of the Irish Free State
Treaties of the Kingdom of Italy (1861–1946)
Treaties of Jamaica
Treaties of Japan
Treaties of Kazakhstan
Treaties of Kenya
Treaties of South Korea
Treaties of Lebanon
Treaties of Lesotho
Treaties of the Libyan Arab Republic
Treaties of Luxembourg
Treaties of Madagascar
Treaties of Malawi
Treaties of Mali
Treaties of Malta
Treaties of Mauritania
Treaties of Mauritius
Treaties of Mexico
Treaties of Myanmar
Treaties of Morocco
Treaties of the Netherlands
Treaties of New Zealand
Treaties of Nicaragua
Treaties of Niger
Treaties of Nigeria
Treaties of Norway
Treaties of Panama
Treaties of Papua New Guinea
Treaties of Paraguay
Treaties of Peru
Treaties of the Estado Novo (Portugal)
Treaties of Rwanda
Treaties of Saint Lucia
Treaties of Saint Vincent and the Grenadines
Treaties of Senegal
Treaties of Seychelles
Treaties of Sierra Leone
Treaties of Slovakia
Treaties of the Solomon Islands
Treaties of the Union of South Africa
Treaties of the Second Spanish Republic
Treaties of the Dominion of Ceylon
Treaties of the Republic of the Sudan (1956–1969)
Treaties of Eswatini
Treaties of Switzerland
Treaties of Tanzania
Treaties of Togo
Treaties of Tunisia
Treaties of Turkey
Treaties of Uganda
Treaties of Uruguay
Treaties of Venezuela
Treaties of Zambia
Treaties of Zimbabwe
1928 in labor relations